Christopher Rush (born 23 November 1944) is a Scottish writer, born in St Monans and for thirty years a teacher of literature in Edinburgh. His books include A Twelvemonth and a Day (chosen by The List magazine in 2005 as one of the 100 best Scottish books of all time) and the highly acclaimed To Travel Hopefully.

In 1983 Rush initiated a literary debate in The Scottish Review: Arts and Environment by suggesting that the up-and-coming generation of Scottish poets drew less on their native places than their elders.

A Twelvemonth and a Day served as inspiration for the film Venus Peter, released in 1989.  The story was also reworked by Rush in a simplified version in 1992 as a children's picture book, Venus Peter Saves the Whale, illustrated by Mairi Hedderwick, which won the Friends of the Earth 1993 Earthworm Award for the book published that year that would most help children to enjoy and care for the Earth.

His 2007 book Will recounts the life of William Shakespeare in the first person, and has been optioned for a movie by Ben Kingsley. It was published by Beautiful Books Limited (UK). Rush also wrote a memoir of Shakespeare called Sex, Lies and Shakespeare, published by Beautiful Books Limited in 2009 (UK).

Rush now lives near his childhood home.

Bibliography

Books
 Resurrection of a Kind (1984)
 A Twelvemonth and a Day, Aberdeen University Press (1985). 
 Peace Comes Dropping Slow, Ramsay Head Press, Edinburgh (1989), 
 Into the Ebb (1989)
 Venus Peter Saves the Whale (1992)
 Last Lesson of the Afternoon (1994)
 To Travel Hopefully (2006)
 Hellfire and Herring (Hardback & Paperback) (2006)
 Will (Beautiful Books Limited) (2007)
 Sex, Lies and Shakespeare (Beautiful Books Limited) (2009)
 Aunt Epp's Guide for Life - from chastity to copper kettles, musings of a Victorian Lady (Michael O'Mara Books Limited) (2009)

Articles
 Elephants in Anstruther: In Search of the Scottish Identity, in Lindsay, Maurice (ed.), The Scottish Review: Arts and Environment 31, August 1983, pp. 43 – 48, 
 Review of Noise and Smoky Breath: An Illustrated Anthology of Glasgow Poems 1900 - 1983 edited by Hamish Whyte, in Lindsay, Maurice (ed.), The Scottish Review: Arts and Environment 31, August 1983, pp. 51 – 53,

Reviews
 Urquhart, Fred (1983), review of Peace Comes Dropping Slow, in Lindsay, Maurice (ed.), 'The Scottish Review: Arts and Environment 31, August 1983, pp. 50 & 51, 
 Wallace, Gavin ( 1984), A Scottish Triptych, which includes a review of Peace Comes Dropping Slow, in Hearn, Sheila G. (ed.), Cencrastus No. 15, New Year 1984, pp.53 & 54, 

References

External links
Books by Christopher Rush on Goodreads
review of Will on The Independent (2007)
The Times Online review of Will (2008)
Review of Will (2008)
Stage adaptations of Christopher Rush books and a short story on brian freeland (2013)

Further reading
 Greig, Andrew (1983), White Elephants in Anstruther, in Lindsay, Maurice (ed.), The Scottish Review: Arts and Environment 32, November 1983, 
 Scott, Alexander (1984), Pink Elephants in Anstruther: Scottish Identity, in Lindsay, Maurice (ed.), The Scottish Review: Arts and Environment'' 33, February 1984, pp. 3 – 8, 

British writers
Scottish writers
1944 births
Living people
People from St Monans